The Svedberg Laboratory (TSL) is a university facility, based in Uppsala, Sweden. The activities at TSL are based around the particle accelerator Gustaf Werner cyclotron.

The main activity is proton therapy for the treatment of cancer, based on an agreement between the Oncology clinic at Uppsala University Hospital and Uppsala University. Beamtime not used for proton therapy is devoted to commercial neutron and proton irradiation projects, mainly for Radiation testing. There is also some time for basic (academic) research and in this case the experiments should be associated to Uppsala University or to EC projects.

TSL is supported by the European Community and belong to the EC projects ERINDA, SkyFlash and CHANDA.

History 
The Svedberg (1884-1971),(Theodor), professor in physical chemistry at Uppsala University from 1912 to 1949, was awarded the Nobel Prize in chemistry in 1926 for his research on dispersed systems (colloidal solutions). He invented the Ultracentrifuge, which was used in the discovery that proteins consist of macromolecules.

Towards the end of the 1930s The Svedberg and his colleagues built their first accelerator, a Neutron generator. In 1945, a donation from the Gustaf Werner Corporation gave the opportunity to build a much larger accelerator, a synchrocyclotron. The Gustaf Werner Institute with the synchrocyclotron as the main research instrument was founded in 1949 and continued to act as a base for research in high-energy physics and radiation biology until 1986 when The Svedberg Laboratory was established.

Intensive discussions concerning the type and size of accelerators Swedish research in nuclear and high-energy physics should have at its disposal took place in the early 1980s, One result of this process was that a decision was taken to bring the magnets of the so-called ICE-ring (Initial Cooling Experiment) from CERN to Uppsala. The accelerator ring was rebuilt as a cooler and storage ring and given the acronym CELSIUS (Cooling with ELectrons and Storing of Ions from the Uppsala Synchrocyclotron).

From 1994 until 2004 The Svedberg Laboratory was a national research facility funded to a large fraction from the Swedish Natural Science Research Council (Swedish Research Council). It was open for research groups from universities and institutes in Sweden and abroad. The laboratory had a nationally recruited board and an international program advisory committee, which gave recommendations concerning the research program by examining proposals from the user groups. Uppsala University was acting as the host of the Laboratory.

The TSL was in 2004 converted from a national laboratory into a university facility and new instructions for the laboratory came into operation July 1, 2004. The main activity of TSL is based on an agreement between Uppsala University Hospital and Uppsala University about continued Proton therapy. The beamtime not used for proton therapy is devoted to commercial neutron and proton irradiation projects. There is still some time for basic (academic) research and in this case the experiments should be associated to Uppsala University or to EU projects.

Proton therapy at TSL 
The proton beam extracted from the cyclotron may have exclusive advantages in treatment of certain human malignant tumours and some other disorders where conventional Radiation therapy or surgery is not feasible. The depth dose distribution, with the Bragg peak, and the relatively sharp penumbra, enables the concentration of radiation to the target volume and minimizes the dose to normal tissue surrounding the target. Proton beam irradiation may lead to cure or shrinkage of tumour burden in cases where other treatment modalities fail.
All patients are carefully investigated by computerized tomography and/or magnetic resonance imaging in order to obtain a detailed knowledge of the position and size of the tumour. Angiography and Positron emission tomography will be used in certain cases. Before the treatments, careful Radiation treatment planning is performed to ensure an optimal dose distribution.
Treatments:
 Eye melanomas. The first patient was treated in April 1989 with a modified 72 MeV beam to 54,5 Gy in 4 fractions using a single field technique.
 Arteriovenous malformation (AVM) of the brain. The first patient with superficially located inoperabel AVM:s was treated in April 1991 with a modified 100 MeV beam utilizing two portals to a total dose of 20 Gy in two fractions.
 Therapy with protons beams in patients with Uveal melanomas and meningeomas in the brain.
 Proton beam therapy as a boost to photon beam therapy in patients with malignant tumours.
 Malignant gliomas. Patients with astrocytomas grade III and IV have received irradiation treatment with photons and protons.
 Meningeomas of the brain. Patients with partially resected meningiomas, WHO grade I, in the brain have been treated since 1994. The treatment is generally given four fractions to a total dose of 24 Gy.
 Tumours in the head-and-neck region, tumours in the base of the skull and adenomas in the pituitary. Most patients have received a combined therapy with photons and protons.
 The first patient with Prostate cancer was treated in late 2002, with 180 MeV. A special couch/platform was built for this purpose (see picture above).
 In 2008 Barncancerfonden (The Swedish Childhood Cancer Foundation) funded construction of an adjustable treatment couch adapted for lying child patients (see picture above) and adjustment of software used for treatments.

In June 2015 the Uppsala University Hospital will finish their treatments at TSL and move over to Skandion, a new dedicated clinic for Proton therapy in Uppsala, Sweden.

The Irradiation facilities for Radiation testing 
At TSL there are facilities with high-energy particle beams for different purposes. 
The users mostly use them for testing reliability of electronic equipment under radiation exposure, accelerated radiation testing. 
Other use has also been seen, such as biomedical research, material science and production of filters and other things.

The following facilities are available:

ANITA, the white spectrum neutron beam facility 
Simulates the Cosmic ray induced neutron field. Designed for Single Event Effects/Soft Error Rate testing.

 Neutron beam with spectrum that resembles the one in the Earth's atmosphere
 High neutron flux, up to 10^7/cm^2/s,  and thus high acceleration factor
 Variable flux and beam spot size and shape according to user specifications
 Spacious user area, > 50 m2

QMN, the quasi-monoenergetic neutron beam facility 
Makes it possible to study the energy dependence of neutron-induced effects in electronics.
 Selectable neutron energy in the 20-175 MeV energy range
 Variable flux, up to 3*10^8 neutrons per second over the beam area
 Variable beam spot size
 Spacious user area, > 50 m2, where quite large equipment can be set up for tests.

PAULA, the proton beam facility 
For Single Event Effects & Total Ionisation Dose testing
 Selectable proton energy in the 20-180 MeV energy range
 High, variable proton flux
 Variable, uniform beam spot size

Heavy Ions facility 
During the years the cyclotron have delivered heavy ions for research and industrial projects.
The cyclotron then used an external ion source, an ECRIS, for preacceleration of heavy ions.

Technical overview

The particle accelerator 

Machine Name: Gustaf Werner Cyclotron

History
The machine was designed in house and constructed during 1946–51 with first beam in 1951. The machine was then rebuilt 1977–86 with first beam in 1986.

Characteristic Beams out of the machine :
ions / energy(MeV/N) /current(pps)
 p 178 3×10^12
 p 98 4×10^13
 14N7+ 45 2×10^10
 129Xe27+ 8.33 1×10^9
Secondary beam facility:
neutrons via 7Li(p,n) reaction
 n 20-175 (1-3)×10^5 per cm2
Transmission Efficiency (source to extracted beam)
 Typical (%): 5
 Best (%):

Technical data
(a)Magnet (nr 1 in picture)
 Type: compact
 Kb (MeV): 192
 Kf (MeV):
 Average Field (max./min. T): 1.75/0.6
 Number of Sectors: 3
 Hill Angular Width (deg.): varies
 Spiral (deg.): 55
 Pole Diameter (m): 2.8
 Injection Radius (m): 0.019
 Extraction Radius (m): 1.175
 Hill Gap (m): 0.2
 Valley Gap (m): 0.38
Trim Coils
 Number: 13
 Maximum Current (A-turns): ca 5000
Harmonic Coils
 Number: 2 sets of 3 coils
 Maximum Current (A-turns): ca 8000
Main Coils
 Number: 2
 Total Ampere Turns: 814000
 Maximum Current (A): 1000
 Stored Energy (MJ): 9
 Total Iron Weight (tons): 600
 Total Coil Weight (tons): 50
Power
 Main Coils (total kW): 275
 Trim Coils (total, maximum, kW): 70
 Refrigerator (cryogenic, kW):

(b)RF (nr 3 in picture)
Acceleration
 Frequency Range (MHz): 12.3 – 24.0
 Harmonic Modes: 1,2,3
 Number of Dees: 2
 Number of Cavities:
 Dee Angular Width (deg.):72-42
Voltage
 At Injection (peak to ground, kV):
 At Extraction (peak to ground, kV):
 Peak (peak to ground, kV): 50
 Line Power (max, kW): 280
 Phase Stability (deg.): ±0.5
 Voltage Stability (%): ±0.1

(c)Injection
 Ion Source: int PIG (nr 2 in picture), ext ECR (not in picture)
 Source Bias Voltage (kV): 20
 External Injection: axial
 Buncher Type: h=1 double gap
 Injection Energy (MeV/n):
 Component: spiral inflectors
 Injection Efficiency (%): 5 - 10
 Injector:

(d)Extraction
Elements, Characteristic

 Isochronous mode: precessional extraction
El. stat. defl. 65 kV, aperture 5 mm, septum 0.5 mm, El. magn.
channel 4.7 kA, 5 mm septum passive focusing channel

 Synchrocyclotron mode: regenerative extraction Same plus
passive peeler, regenerator
Typical Efficiency (%): 50
Best Efficiency (%): 80

(e)Vacuum (nr 4 in picture)
Pumps: 
 2 Diffusion pump for main vacuum in tank, 
 1 Diffusion pump for intermediate vacuum, 
 2 Meissner traps
Achieved Vacuum: 10-5 Pa (10-7 mbar)

The beamlines 
There are several beamlines at TSL: 
The A-line was used for nuclide production, has not been used for several years but is in running condition. The B-line is in commonly use for delivering proton beam for irradiation testing. The C-line is used for biomedical research with different heavy ions. The D-line is commonly used for delivering proton beam for production of neutron beams for irradiation testing. The G-line is commonly used for delivering proton beam for Proton therapy.

Laboratory directors 
 Arne Johansson, Professor emeritus,  1986-1992
 Leif Nilssson, Professor emeritus, 1993-1998
 Curt Ekström, Professor emeritus, 1998-2008
 Björn Gålnander, PH.D., 2008-2015

Notes and references

1986 establishments in Sweden
Radiology organizations
Research institutes established in 1986
Uppsala University